Anilios diversus, or the northern blind snake, is a species of snake in the family Typhlopidae. The species is endemic to Australia.

Geographic range
Native to northern Australia, A. diversus is found in Northern Territory, Queensland, and Western Australia.

Habitat
The preferred natural habitats of A. diversus are desert and grassland.

Reproduction
A. diversus is oviparous.

References

Further reading
Boulenger GA (1896). Catalogue of the Snakes in the British Museum (Natural History). Volume III. London: Trustees of the British Museum (Natural History). (Taylor and Francis, printers). xiv + 727 pp. + Plates I–XXV. (Typhlops diversus, pp. 584–585).
Cogger HG (2014). Reptiles and Amphibians of Australia, Seventh Edition. Clayton, Victoria, Australia: CSIRO Publishing. xxx + 1,033 pp. .
Hedges SB, Marion AB, Lipp KM, Marin J, Vidal N (2014). "A taxonomic framework for typhlopid snakes from the Caribbean and other regions (Reptilia, Squamata)". Caribbean Herpetology 49: 1–61. (Anilios diversus, new combination, p. 33).
Robb J (1966). "The Generic Status of Australasian Typhlopids (Reptilia: Squamata)". Annals and Magazine of Natural History, Thirteenth Series 9: 675–679. (Ramphotyphlops diversus, new combination, p. 676).
Waite ER (1894). "Notes on Australian Typhlopidae". Proceedings of the Linnean Society of New South Wales, Second Series 9: 9–13 + Plate I. (Typhlops diversus, new species, pp. 10–11 + Plate I, figures 4–6).
Wallach V (2006). "The Nomenclatural Status of Australian Ramphotyphlops (Serpentes: Typhlopidae)". Bulletin of the Maryland Herpetological Society 42 (1): 8–24. (Austrotyphlops diversus, new combination, p. 13).
Wilson, Steve; Swan, Gerry (2013). A Complete Guide to Reptiles of Australia, Fourth Edition. Sydney: New Holland Publishers. 522 pp. .

diversus
Reptiles described in 1894
Snakes of Australia